The Juno Ludovisi (also called Hera Ludovisi) is a colossal Roman marble head of the 1st century CE from an acrolithic statue of an idealized and youthful Antonia Minor as the goddess Juno.  Added to the Ludovisi collection formed by Cardinal Ludovico Ludovisi, it is now in the Palazzo Altemps, Museo Nazionale Romano, Rome.

Casts of it are to be seen at the University of Cambridge Classics Department Casts Gallery, UK; Bryn Mawr College, Pennsylvania, USA; the Goethehaus in Weimar, Germany; George Mason University, Johnson Center, Fairfax, USA; the University of Helsinki, Department of Art History, Finland; and the University of Tartu Art Museum, Estonia.

The American-British novelist Henry James wrote of the Ludovisi Juno several times including in his first long form novel Roderick Hudson.  He described it in its surround as follows..."One warm, still day, late in the Roman autumn, our two young men were seated beneath one of the high-stemmed pines of the Villa Ludovisi. They had been spending an hour in the mouldy little garden-house where the colossal mask of the famous Juno looks out with blank eyes from that dusky corner which must seem to her the last possible stage of a lapse from Olympus"...

Notes

Ludovisi collection
Collections of the National Roman Museum
Hellenistic-style Roman sculptures
1st-century Roman sculptures
Marble sculptures in Italy
Sculptures of women in Italy
Sculptures of Roman goddesses
Juno (mythology)